Mukhammedzhan Muratuly Seysen (Mūhammedjan Mūratūly Seisen; born 14 February 1999) is a Kazakhstani footballer who plays as a goalkeeper for Taraz.

Club career
Seysen made his professional debut for Taraz in the Kazakhstan Premier League on 15 March 2019, starting in the 1–4 away loss against Tobol.

International career
He made his debut for Kazakhstan national football team on 4 June 2021 in a friendly against North Macedonia.

References

External links
 Mukhammejan Seisen at Vesti.kz 
 
 
 

1999 births
Living people
People from Taraz
Kazakhstani footballers
Kazakhstan youth international footballers
Kazakhstan under-21 international footballers
Kazakhstan international footballers
Association football goalkeepers
FC Taraz players
Kazakhstan Premier League players
Kazakhstan First Division players